Kobi Libii is an American comedian and actor from Fort Wayne, Indiana. He was a cast member on the Opposition with Jordan Klepper, a news satire television series that aired on Comedy Central. On the show, Libii was billed as a "citizen journalist". Other television series in which he has appeared include Doubt, Transparent, Girls, and Madam Secretary. He has also performed in several plays, including the documentary play Boiling Pot, which he co-created with Evan Joiner. The play premiered at New York City's Cherry Lane Theatre in 2007. He later performed in an MCC Theater production of the Paul Downs Colaizzo play Really Really in 2013. Libii also made an appearance on Klepper as himself.

Libii graduated from Fort Wayne's Snider High School in 2003. He went on to graduate from Yale University in 2007, where he studied theater and was a member of the improv troupe Just Add Water. He studied improvisation at the Second City in Chicago, Illinois.

Filmography

Television

Theater

References

External links
 

Living people
African-American male comedians
American male comedians
African-American male actors
American television actors
Yale University alumni
Actors from Fort Wayne, Indiana
American male stage actors
American male comedy actors
Year of birth missing (living people)
21st-century African-American people